Nuclear pore complex protein Nup133, or Nucleoporin Nup133, is a protein that in humans is encoded by the NUP133 gene.

Function 

The nuclear envelope creates distinct nuclear and cytoplasmic compartments in eukaryotic cells. It consists of two concentric membranes perforated by nuclear pores, large protein complexes that form aqueous channels to regulate the flow of macromolecules between the nucleus and the cytoplasm. These complexes are composed of at least 100 different polypeptide subunits, many of which belong to the nucleoporin family. The nucleoporin protein encoded by this gene displays evolutionarily conserved interactions with other nucleoporins. This protein, which localizes to both sides of the nuclear pore complex at interphase, remains associated with the complex during mitosis and is targeted at early stages to the reforming nuclear envelope. This protein also localizes to kinetochores of mitotic cells.

Interactions 

NUP133 has been shown to interact with NUP107.

References

Further reading 

 
 
 
 
 
 
 
 
 
 
 
 

Nuclear pore complex